Azadegan Metro Station is the southern terminus in line 3 of the Tehran metro.

References

Tehran Metro stations
Railway stations opened in 2014
2013 establishments in Iran